Kheyrabad (also Romanized as Kheyrābād) is a village in Gazik Rural District, Gazik District, Darmian County, South Khorasan Province, Iran. At the 2006 census, its population was 670, in 127 families.

References 

Populated places in Darmian County